Theasinensin D is polyphenol flavonoid found in oolong tea. It's an atropisomer of theasinensin A.

References 

 
 

Flavanols
Polyphenols
Biphenyls